Vince Kenny (29 December 1924 – 2006) was an English professional footballer who played as a full back.

Career
Born in Sheffield, Kenny played for Atlas & Norfolk Works, Sheffield Wednesday and Carlisle United.

References

1924 births
2006 deaths
Footballers from Sheffield
English footballers
Forgemasters Sports & Social F.C. players
Sheffield Wednesday F.C. players
Carlisle United F.C. players
English Football League players
Association football fullbacks